Gymnopilus megasporus is a species of mushroom in the family Hymenogastraceae.

See also

List of Gymnopilus species

External links
Gymnopilus megasporus at Index Fungorum

megasporus
Fungi of North America
Taxa named by Cheryl A. Grgurinovic